Arslan Khan can refer to:

 Arslan Khan (Canadian cricketer) (born 1999), Canadian cricketer
 Arslan Khan (Indian cricketer) (born 1999), Indian cricketer
 Arslan Khan (prince), prince of the Karluks